The 21st Lambda Literary Awards were held in 2009, to honour works of LGBT literature published in 2008.

Special awards

Nominees and winners

External links
 21st Lambda Literary Awards

Lambda Literary Awards
Lambda
Lists of LGBT-related award winners and nominees
2009 in LGBT history
2009 awards in the United States